Susan Foster is an American jewelry designer and philanthropist.

Early life

Susan Foster was raised in East Hampton, New York. She grew up surrounded by artisans and with artistic relatives. Foster resided close to the homes of  Jackson Pollock as well as Willem de Kooning, where she found creative inspiration. Foster's artistic surroundings framed her upbringing and were a big influence on her future career as a jewelry designer.

Education

Foster studied in detail traditional jewelry design and creation with European goldsmiths. She further enhanced her knowledge by going to the esteemed Gemological Institute of America (GIA) and studied extensively diamonds, colored gemstones, synthetic gemstones, and pearl grading.

Career

Foster began her career as a jewelry designer in 1999 where her collection was soon featured on the covers of Mademoiselle, InStyle, Glamour, and Elle. At that time her collection was picked up by Neiman Marcus and Bergdorf Goodman.  In 2008 Foster opened her exclusive, by-appointment-only boutique in Los Angeles, California.
t
In 2014, Foster relocated to New York City, where she currently works with private clients from her Upper East Side showroom, which was featured on the cover of NYC&G. Her Fifth Avenue showroom is decorated in authentic and rare Art Deco furnishings she collected during her global travels. New York's elite celebrated Foster's arrival and NY showroom at The Carlyle, a party hosted by Indre Rockefeller and British Vogue's Fashion Features Director, Sarah Harris. The event was attended by Nell Diamond, Model Jess Hart, Architectural Digest's Jane Keltner de Valle, Sarah Brown, Rickie De Sole, and covered by W Magazine.

Foster's fine jewelry collection is available with select retailers worldwide including Just One Eye in Los Angeles, Fivestory in New York, as well as Harrods  and Matches.com in the UK. Susan Foster's jewelry has been featured in top publications including Vogue, Harper's Bazaar, Tatler, Marie Claire, Elle  and InStyle. Foster's designs have been worn by notable celebrities including Kate Bosworth, Kerry Washington, Mandy Moore, Sarah Harris, Kate Hudson, Zoe Saldana and Mila Kunis. In 2016, Susan Foster's jewelry was auctioned off at Christie's for the private collection of President and Mrs. Ronald Reagan. In 2017, Foster was commissioned by Si Newhouse and the team at Conde Nast to custom create the retirement gift for long time powerhouse editor Alexandra Shulman. Ms. Shulman dedicated a page about Foster and her monogramed retirement earrings in her best selling London Times autobiography, called “Clothes... and Other Things That Matter”.

References

Living people
People from Queens, New York
Hunter College alumni
Year of birth missing (living people)